The 2013 Ulster Senior Hurling Championship was the 68th installment of the annual Ulster Senior Hurling Championship held under the auspices of the Ulster GAA. Antrim were the defending champions, and secured their twelfth consecutive title in a much delayed final played against Down on 2 February 2014.

The delays, which arose from a fixture clash caused by a semi-final draw between Down and Derry, and exacerbated by a ban on inter-county training in the winter of 2013, was heavily criticised for undermining the competition. The winners, Antrim, in fact never played a single match of the 2013 Championship in 2013, having progressed automatically to the final.

Format
As the Ulster championship is of a lower standard than its Leinster and Munster counterparts, there was no entry from the Ulster Championship to the All-Ireland Championship proper. Antrim will instead enter that competition through the preliminary round of the Leinster Senior Hurling Championship.

The other Ulster teams are not eligible, and took part in the Christy Ring Cup, the second tier All-Ireland hurling championship, Down winning the competition.

Teams

Bracket
The draw for the Ulster championship is seeded, and takes place in a single elimination format. Antrim receive a bye to the final, Derry to the semi-final.

Box scores

Quarter-final

Semi-final

Semi-final replay

Final
The final was originally scheduled for 7 July 2013 but was postponed to allow the semi-final replay between Down and Derry to take place on that day. The final was re-scheduled for 3 November 2013, and finally 2 February 2014.

References

External links
Ulster GAA

Ulster Hurling Senior
Hurling
Ulster Senior Hurling Championship